The 2009–10 FAW Welsh Cup was the 123rd edition of the annual knockout tournament for competitive football teams in Wales, excluding those who play in the English League System. The 2009–10 tournament commenced on 14 August 2009 and concluded at Parc y Scarlets on 1 May 2010. Bangor City won the cup with a 3–2 win against Port Talbot Town.

Calendar

Preliminary round

North

Source: FAW Welsh Cup

South

Source: FAW Welsh Cup

First round

North

Source: FAW Welsh Cup

South

Source: FAW Welsh Cup

Second round

North

Source: FAW Welsh Cup

South

Source: FAW Welsh Cup

Third round

Source: FAW Welsh Cup

Fourth round

Source: FAW Welsh Cup

Quarter finals

Source: FAW Welsh Cup

Semi finals

Final

References

 Football Association of Wales: Welsh Senior Cup
 Welsh Premier.com

2009-10
1